Henri Fuchs (born 23 June 1970) is a German football manager and former striker. He is currently the head responsible of the youth academy at FC Rot-Weiß Erfurt

Club career 
Fuchs played for 1. FC Köln, Chemnitzer FC, Dynamo Dresden, VfB Leipzig, Hansa Rostock and Rot-Weiß Erfurt.

International career 
He was a part of the East German squad at the 1989 FIFA World Youth Championship, playing all three matches.

After retirement 
After retiring, Fuchs became the youth head coach for his former club FC Rot-Weiß Erfurt and was named as interim head coach for Rot-Weiß Erfurt on 27 April 2009.

On 3 July 2018, Fuchs was appointed as the head responsible of the youth academy at FC Rot-Weiß Erfurt.

References

External links
 
 

1970 births
Living people
Association football forwards
German footballers
Germany under-21 international footballers
East German footballers
Bundesliga players
2. Bundesliga players
1. FC Köln players
Chemnitzer FC players
Dynamo Dresden players
1. FC Lokomotive Leipzig players
FC Hansa Rostock players
FC Rot-Weiß Erfurt players
People from Greifswald
FC Rot-Weiß Erfurt managers
TSG Neustrelitz players
DDR-Oberliga players
3. Liga managers
Footballers from Mecklenburg-Western Pomerania
German football managers